Milton William Shreve (May 3, 1858 – December 23, 1939) was a Republican member of the U.S. House of Representatives from Pennsylvania.

Biography
Milton W. Shreve was born in Chapmanville, Pennsylvania.  He attended the Edinboro State Normal School and Allegheny College in Meadville, Pennsylvania.  He graduated from Bucknell University in Lewisburg, Pennsylvania, in 1884.  He studied law and was admitted to the bar in Erie County, Pennsylvania and commenced practice in Erie, Pennsylvania.  He was the Erie County district attorney from 1899 to 1902.  He was a member of the Pennsylvania State House of Representatives from 1907 to 1912 and in the session of 1911 succeeded to the speakership.

Shreve was elected as a Republican to the Sixty-third Congress.  He was an unsuccessful candidate for reelection in 1914.  He resumed the practice of law in Erie, and also engaged in banking and interested in several manufacturing plants.  He was again elected as a Republican to the Sixty-sixth Congress; reelected as an Independent Republican to the Sixty-seventh Congress and as a Republican to the Sixty-eighth through Seventy-second Congresses.  He was an unsuccessful candidate for reelection in 1932.  He resumed the practice of law in Erie until his death there.  He was buried in Erie Cemetery.

See also
List of representatives from Pennsylvania's 25th congressional district

Sources

The Political Graveyard

External links 
 

1858 births
1939 deaths
Members of the Pennsylvania House of Representatives
Speakers of the Pennsylvania House of Representatives
Politicians from Erie, Pennsylvania
Edinboro University of Pennsylvania alumni
Pennsylvania Independents
Republican Party members of the United States House of Representatives from Pennsylvania
Independent Republican members of the United States House of Representatives
Burials in Pennsylvania
20th-century American politicians